Marckho Sandy Meraudje (born 4 December 1994) is an Indonesian professional footballer who plays as a right back for Liga 1 club PSS Sleman and the Indonesia national team.

Club career

Sriwijaya
In 2017, Merauje signed a year contract with Sriwijaya. He made his debut on 3 May 2017 in a match against Bhayangkara. On 26 September 2017, Merauje scored his first goal for Sriwijaya against Persela Lamongan in the 47th minute at the Bumi Sriwijaya Stadium, Palembang.

Madura United
He was signed for Madura United to play in Liga 1 in the 2019 season. Marckho made his league debut on 17 May 2019 in a match against Persela Lamongan at the Surajaya Stadium, Lamongan. In two seasons with Madura United, Merauje made 30 league appearances.

Borneo
In 2021, Marckho signed a contract with Indonesian Liga 1 club Borneo. Marckho made his league debut on 4 September 2021 in a match against Persebaya Surabaya at the Wibawa Mukti Stadium, Cikarang.

PSS Sleman
Meraudje was signed for PSS Sleman to play in Liga 1 in the 2022–23 season. He made his league debut on 29 July 2022 in a match against RANS Nusantara at the Pakansari Stadium, Cibinong.

International career
In November 2021, Indonesian coach, Shin Tae-yong sent Marckho his first call up to the full national side replace Vava Mario Yagalo, for the friendly matches in Turkey against Afghanistan and Myanmar.
He made his official international debut on 25 November 2021, against Myanmar in a friendly match in Antalya, Turkey.

Career statistics

Club

International

Honours

Club
Sriwijaya
 East Kalimantan Governor Cup: 2018

International
Indonesia
 AFF Championship runner-up: 2020

References

External links
 Marckho Meraudje at Soccerway
 Marckho Meraudje at Liga Indonesia

1995 births
Living people
Papuan people
Indonesian footballers
People from Jayapura
Sriwijaya F.C. players
Madura United F.C. players
Borneo F.C. players
PSS Sleman players
Liga 1 (Indonesia) players
Indonesia international footballers
Association football defenders
Sportspeople from Papua